Lodewikus Theodorus "Theo" Oosthuizen (born 24 February 1964) is a former rugby union player who represented both  and . He never played in a test match for South Africa, but played in four tour matches. He did play seven test matches for Namibia.

Rugby career
He later moved to the then South West Africa, which at the time participated in the South African domestic rugby competitions. Oosthuizen made his debut for South West Africa in 1988 and after independence of Namibia in 1990, he played in Namibia's first test match on 24 March 1990 in Windhoek against Zimbabwe.

There was talk that he was included in the 1996 South African touring team to Argentina and Europe on the basis of his friendship with then coach Andre Markgraaff, who was also involved with that particular provincial side.

Test history (Namibia)

See also
List of South Africa national rugby union players – Springbok no. 646

References

External links
 

1964 births
Living people
People from Mossel Bay
Afrikaner people
South African people of Dutch descent
South African rugby union players
Rugby union flankers
South Africa international rugby union players
Namibia international rugby union players
Free State Cheetahs players
Griquas (rugby union) players
Rugby union players from the Western Cape